1923 was the 30th season of County Championship cricket in England. Yorkshire won the title for the 12th time.

Honours
County Championship - Yorkshire
Minor Counties Championship - Buckinghamshire
Wisden - Arthur Gilligan, Roy Kilner, George Macaulay, Cecil Parkin, Maurice Tate

County Championship

Leading batsmen 
Patsy Hendren topped the averages with 3010 runs @ 77.17

Leading bowlers 
Wilfred Rhodes topped the averages with 134 wickets @ 11.54

References

Annual reviews
 Wisden Cricketers' Almanack 1924

External links
 CricketArchive – season summary

1923 in English cricket
English cricket seasons in the 20th century